Catherine Benson (born February 10, 1992) is an American rugby union player. She was selected for the squad to the 2017 Women's Rugby World Cup in Ireland. She also played at the 2016 Women's Rugby Super Series in Salt Lake City, Utah.

Benson was named in the Eagles squad for the 2022 Pacific Four Series in New Zealand. She was selected in the Eagles squad for the 2021 Rugby World Cup in New Zealand.

References

External links
 Catherine Benson at USA Rugby

1992 births
Living people
American female rugby union players
United States women's international rugby union players
Pennsylvania State University alumni
21st-century American women